"Move Ya Body" is a song by American musical duo Nina Sky featuring rapper Jabba. It was released on April 12, 2004, as the lead single from their debut album, Nina Sky (2004). The song became the duo's only solo single to reach the top 40 of the Billboard Hot 100. The song was ranked at number 250 on Blenders "500 Greatest Songs Since You Were Born" and is well known for the use of the recurring ostinato on the bongos known as the "Coolie Dance" riddim. This has been the subject and musical motif of many musical samples.

Background
Record producer the Jettsonz introduced the girls to Cipha Sounds, a hip hop DJ. Cipha Sounds was impressed when he heard the girls sing and suggested that they compose a song using the "Coolie Dance" riddim. The twins wrote "Move Ya Body" in response, and recorded a demo. The demo got them signed as Nina Sky to Next Plateau Entertainment and Universal Records. After writing "Move Ya Body", Nina Sky quickly wrote more songs to form their debut album, released in June 2004.

Composition
"Move Ya Body" has a length of three minutes and fifty-four seconds. It features a guest appearance by rapper Jabba and was written by Nicole Albino, Natalie Albino, Cordel Burrell, Luis Diaz, Paul George, Curtis Bedeau, Gerald Charles, Brian George, Elijah Wells and Lionel Bermingham while it was produced by Wells and Bermingham. It was recorded in 2003 in The Hit Factory studios, located in New York City. The song contains lyrics from Lisa Lisa and Cult Jam's song, "Can You Feel the Beat". The title of Lisa Lisa and Cult Jam's song was repeated many times during the song.

Critical reception
The song was ranked the 29th best song of 2004 by Pitchfork.

Commercial performance
The song was a huge hit and is one of only a few singles by the duo to chart (the others include "Turnin' Me On" and "Curtain Call"). "Move Ya Body" is their biggest hit, as it charted at number four on the US Billboard Hot 100 and number 22 on the 2004 Billboard Year-End Chart. It also reached number six on the UK Singles Chart. It was certified gold by the RIAA on January 26, 2005. It also reached the top ten in Belgium, the Netherlands, Denmark, Germany, New Zealand and the US Billboard Mainstream and Rhythmic Top 40 charts. The song earned the duo two nominations for International Dance Music Award (Best Pop Dance Track and Best New Dance Artist (Group)) and one nomination for Soul Train Lady of Soul Award (Best R&B/Soul Single, Group, Band or Duo), all in 2005. They won one award for the song, Rapgra Award (Utwor R'n'B) in 2004.

Music video
An accompanying music video for the song was released in 2004. Posted in 2012, it was viewed over two million times on YouTube. However it was never posted on Nina Sky's official channel and it became unavailable few years later. The video had 34 second shorter length than the song. It features guest appearances from Jabba, Cipha Sounds and Angie Martinez. The whole video takes place in a nightclub and features the twins, mostly singing and dancing to the song.

Awards and nominations

Track listings

 US maxi-CD single
 "Move Ya Body" (radio edit) – 3:30
 "Move Ya Body" (instrumental) – 3:30
 "Move Ya Body" (call out hook) – 0:19
 "In a Dream" (radio edit) – 3:25
 "In a Dream" (acappella) – 3:25

 US 12-inch single
A1. "Move Ya Body" (radio edit) – 3:30
A2. "Move Ya Body" (instrumental) – 3:30
B1. "In a Dream" (radio edit) – 3:25
B2. "In a Dream" (acapella) – 3:25

 UK and Australian CD single
 "Move Ya Body" – 3:30
 "Move Ya Body" (Hyperspace remix) – 4:28
 "In a Dream" – 3:25
 "Move Ya Body" (video)

 UK 12-inch single
A1. "Move Ya Body" – 3:56
A2. "Move Ya Body" (Hyperspace remix) – 4:28
B1. "Move Ya Body" (instrumental) – 3:30
B2. "Move Ya Body" (acapella) – 3:37

 European CD single
 "Move Ya Body" – 3:30
 "In a Dream" – 3:25

 European maxi-CD single
 "Move Ya Body" (radio edit) – 3:30
 "Move Ya Body" (Jiggy Joint radio mix) – 3:30
 "In a Dream" (radio edit) – 3:25
 "Move Ya Body (album version video) – 4:30

Charts

Weekly charts

Year-end charts

Certifications

Release history

See also
 List of number-one dance airplay hits of 2004 (U.S.)

References

External links
 

2004 debut singles
2004 songs
Next Plateau Entertainment singles
Nina Sky songs
Reggae fusion songs
Songs about dancing
Universal Records singles